East Valley is a census-designated place (CDP) in Douglas County, Nevada, United States. The population was 1,474 at the 2010 census.

Geography
East Valley is located directly east of Gardnerville on the east side of the Carson Valley in western Nevada.

Demographics

References

Census-designated places in Douglas County, Nevada
Census-designated places in Nevada